"Chase" is the fortieth single by L'Arc-en-Ciel, released on December 21, 2011. The single reached number 2 on the Oricon chart, selling 71,894 copies in the first week.

The song was used for live action film adaptation of Wild 7, released on December 21, 2011.

Track listing

References

L'Arc-en-Ciel songs
Songs written by Hyde (musician)
Songs written by Ken (musician)
2011 singles
Japanese film songs
2011 songs